José Gabriel Rodríguez Novoa (born 10 November 1995) is a Colombian footballer who currently plays as a forward for Cancún.

Career statistics

Club

Notes

References

1995 births
Living people
Colombian footballers
Colombian expatriate footballers
Association football forwards
Ascenso MX players
Expatriate footballers in Mexico
Colombian expatriate sportspeople in Mexico
Atlante F.C. footballers
Cimarrones de Sonora players
Pioneros de Cancún footballers
People from Bolívar Department
21st-century Colombian people